Livanov (female version Livanova) is a Russian surname. Notable persons with that name include:
Aristarkh Livanov (born 1947), Russian  actor
Boris Livanov (1904–1972), Russian film actor, and screenwriter
Dmitry Livanov (born 1967), Russian professor and politician
Vasily Livanov (born 1935), Russian film actor and screenwriter 

Russian-language surnames